Boranup, in the Shire of Augusta-Margaret River in the South West region of Western Australia, is the site of a large coastal dune blow out known as the "Boranup sand patch" as part of the Boranup beach, and the site of a former M. C. Davies timber company mill.  The sand patch area and sand blows affected the alignment of the Busselton to Flinders Bay railway.

It is a karri forest remnant area in the Leeuwin-Naturaliste National Park, as well as a Western Australian State Forest area.

Boranup Forest contains many limestone karst caves, including Nannup Cave and Dingo Cave.

The Boranup area includes private property, a cafe and a gallery, a maze and a scenic drive.

See also
Karridale
1961 Western Australian bushfires

Notes

South West (Western Australia)